The Schwinger–Dyson equations (SDEs) or Dyson–Schwinger equations, named after Julian Schwinger and Freeman Dyson, are general relations between correlation functions in quantum field theories (QFTs). They are also referred to as the Euler–Lagrange equations of quantum field theories, since they are the equations of motion corresponding to the Green's function. They form a set of infinitely many functional differential equations, all coupled to each other, sometimes referred to as the infinite tower of SDEs.

In his paper "The S-Matrix in Quantum electrodynamics", Dyson derived relations between different S-matrix elements, or more specific "one-particle Green's functions", in quantum electrodynamics, by summing up infinitely many Feynman diagrams, thus working in a perturbative approach. Starting from his variational principle, Schwinger derived a set of equations for Green's functions non-perturbatively, which generalize Dyson's equations to the Schwinger–Dyson equations for the Green functions of quantum field theories. Today they provide a non-perturbative approach to quantum field theories and applications can be found in many fields of theoretical physics, such as solid-state physics and elementary particle physics.

Schwinger also derived an equation for the two-particle irreducible Green functions, which is nowadays referred to as the inhomogeneous Bethe–Salpeter equation.

Derivation 
Given a polynomially bounded functional  over the field configurations, then, for any state vector (which is a solution of the QFT), we have

Equivalently, in the density state formulation, for any (valid) density state , we have

This infinite set of equations can be used to solve for the correlation functions nonperturbatively.

To make the connection to diagrammatic techniques (like Feynman diagrams) clearer, it is often convenient to split the action  as

Then, we can rewrite the SD equations as

For example, if

then, from the properties of the functional integrals

the Schwinger–Dyson equation for the generating functional is

An example: φ4
To give an example, suppose

for a real field φ.

Then,

The Schwinger–Dyson equation for this particular example is:

Note that since

is not well-defined because

is a distribution in

x1, x2 and x3,

this equation needs to be regularized.

 

and

 

etc.

(Unless there is spontaneous symmetry breaking, the odd correlation functions vanish.)

See also
Functional renormalization group
Dyson equation
Path integral formulation

References

Further reading
There are not many books that treat the Schwinger–Dyson equations. Here are three standard references:

There are some review article about applications of the Schwinger–Dyson equations with applications to special field of physics. 
For applications to Quantum Chromodynamics there are

Quantum field theory
Differential equations
Freeman Dyson